The  2019 Battle of the Giants is the 41st season of Battle of the Giants a football competition held every year, under the auspices of the Fiji Football Association in which the top district teams take part.

The competition, which started in 1978, was due to the foresight of J.D. Maharaj, who saw it as a way of earning money for cash starved football associations in Fiji. This was the first time that a football competition in Fiji was sponsored by businesses. The competition has been held every year except 1987, when restrictions placed by the military government on organised competitions on Sunday led to all soccer competitions in Fiji being abandoned.

Teams 
The 8 teams from 2019 Fiji Premier League play the Battle of The Giants.

Group stage 
The 8 teams were split in two groups with four teams each. The top two advanced to semifinal.

Group A

Results

Group B

Results

Semi-finals

3rd-place match

Final

Top scorers

See also 
 2019 Vodafone Senior League
 2019 Fiji Premier League
 2019 Inter-District Championship
 2019 Inter-District Championship - Senior Division
 2019 Fiji Football Association Cup Tournament

References

External links
RSSSF

Fiji Battle of the Giants
Battle of the Giants